The Maratón de Mar del Plata is an annual marathon foot-race which takes place in Mar del Plata, Argentina, during the Southern Hemisphere's Summer, usually in .

Past winners
Key:

References

External links
 Past results from ARRS

Recurring sporting events established in 1987
Marathons in Argentina
Sport in Mar del Plata